Manuela Siegrist (born 18 May 1990 in Basel) is a Swiss curler. Playing third for Silvana Tirinzoni's team which represented Switzerland at the 2018 Winter Olympics, she stepped away from the game at the end of the 2017–18 season.

Personal life
Siegrist is currently a masters student in economics at the University of Basel.

References

External links
 Team Tirinzoni's Home Page
 

Swiss female curlers
Living people
1990 births
Sportspeople from Basel-Stadt
Swiss curling champions
Continental Cup of Curling participants
Curlers at the 2018 Winter Olympics
Olympic curlers of Switzerland
21st-century Swiss women